Ambapuram cave temple or Nedumbi Basadi is a rock-cut Jain cave temple in Ambapuram village near Vijayawada in the state of Andhra Pradesh.

History 
Jainism became popular in the Vijayawada region during the reign of Eastern Chalukyas or Vengi Chalukyas in the 7th century CE. During the 7th—8th century CE, a total of five Jain caves were constructed in Ambapuram and Adavinekkalam hills. The village derives from the image of Goddess Ambika inside the Jain cave temple.

Architecture 
The cave temple enshrines three cells — Veranda, antarala and garbhagriha. The verandah has plain walls and ceilings devoid of sculptures. The antharala features images of yaksha on either side of the door and an idol of Parshvanatha having a serpent hood with five heads. The antharala has an image of Goddess Ambika as protector deity and a carving of an unidentified deity. There is an image of chauri (whisk) bearers on each side of Mahavira. The rear wall of the garbhagriha houses an idol of Mahavira, the 24th Tirthankara, in lotus position with the symbol of lion stamped on the pedestal. The cave temple also features a rock-cut miniature Jain stupa. The idols date back to 7th century during the reign of Kubja Vishnuvardhana ( CE).

In 2019, Cultural Centre of Vijayawada, RCV along with 70 students organised a trek to promote tourism to this cave temple.

See also 
 Danavulapadu Jain temple
 Bommalagutta
 Kulpakji

References

Citations

Sources

External links 
 

Jain temples in Andhra Pradesh
7th-century Jain temples
Jain rock-cut architecture
Jain caves in India